Midol is a brand of over-the-counter analgesic drugs marketed for menstrual cramping and other effects related to premenstrual syndrome and menstruation. Various subbrands are formulated using different active ingredients. Midol is distributed by Bayer.

Midol was originally sold in 1911 as a headache and toothache remedy that was considered safer because it did not use the narcotics typically used at the time. It was then promoted as a cure for hiccups claiming it controlled spasms, and finally as a remedy for menstrual cramps and bloating. A formulation sold in the 1980s was made with the sympathomimetic cinnamedrine. It had been reported to have abuse potential as an appetite suppressant and sympathomimetic agent.

The "Midol Complete" formulation consists of:
 Acetaminophen 500 mg (pain reliever)
 Caffeine 60 mg  (stimulant)
 Pyrilamine maleate 15 mg (antihistamine)

The "Extended Relief" formulation consists of:
 Naproxen sodium 220 mg (NSAID, pain reliever/fever reducer)

The "Teen" formulation consists of:
 Acetaminophen 500 mg (pain reliever)
 Pamabrom 25 mg (diuretic)

The "Liquid Gels" formulation consists of:
 Ibuprofen 200 mg (NSAID, pain reliever)

The "PM" formulation consists of:
 Acetaminophen 500 mg (pain reliever)
 Diphenhydramine citrate 38 mg (sedative antihistamine)

There are concerns drugs like Midol, which is an NSAID, increases risk of bleeding, kidney damage and has other negative effects on cardiovascular system.

References

External links 
 Official website

Bayer brands
Products introduced in 1911